The Red Tuesday bushfires occurred on 1 February 1898 in South Gippsland, Victoria, Australia. The bushfires claimed 12 lives, destroyed over 2,000 buildings, and affected about 15,000 people, leaving 2,500 homeless.

References

External links
State Library of Victoria's Bushfires in Victoria Research Guide Guide to locating books, government reports, websites, statistics, newspaper reports and images about the Red Tuesday fires.

1898 in Australia
1898 fires in Oceania
Bushfires in Victoria (Australia)
1890s in Victoria (Australia)
19th-century wildfires
1898 natural disasters
February 1898 events
Gippsland (region)